Grosjean is a surname of French or Belgian origin from the adjective gros (large) and the forename Jean. As gros-jean, it is sometimes applied in French to a person who is perceived as stupid.

People
 Alice Lee Grosjean, confidante of 20th-century Louisiana politician Huey Long
André Grosjean, Swiss water polo player at the 1948 Olympics
 Bruno Grosjean, a possible real name for purported Swiss Holocaust survivor Binjamin Wilkomirski
Catherine Grosjean (born 1947), French Olympic swimmer
 Ernest Grosjean (1844–1936), French composer and organist
Fernand Grosjean (1924–2015), Swiss Olympic alpine skier
François Grosjean, French psycholinguist and researcher on bilingualism
Georges Grosjean, Belgian field hockey player at the 1928 Olympics
James Grosjean, American gambler and author
Jean Grosjean (1912–2006), French poet, writer and translator
Joris Grosjean (born 1993), French badminton player
Marion Jollès Grosjean (born 1981), French journalist and television presenter
Matthew Grosjean, American alpine skier
Roger Grosjean (1920–1975), French archeologist especially interested in the prehistory of Corsica
Romain Grosjean, Franco-Swiss racing driver
Sébastien Grosjean, French tennis player
 Sylvain Grosjean (born 1990), French badminton player

Other uses
Grosjean v. American Press Co., a US Supreme Court case

French-language surnames